Recreation Building, or Rec Hall as it is more commonly known, is a field house located on the University Park campus of the Pennsylvania State University. It was opened on January 15, 1929, and is still in use. Previously, Penn State's indoor sports teams played in a building known as the Armory, which was razed to allow expansion of the Willard Building. The men's and women's basketball teams moved to the Bryce Jordan Center in 1996 but the gymnastics, volleyball, and wrestling teams continue to compete at Rec Hall. The well-known Nittany Lion Shrine is located nearby this building. The Penn State IFC/Panhellenic Dance Marathon, commonly known as THON, was held in Rec Hall from 1999 to 2006, but was subsequently moved to the Bryce Jordan Center.

The architect was Charles Z. Klauder, who had designed the University of Pennsylvania's Palestra. The Colonial Georgian design of Rec Hall was chosen to "harmonize" with other new structures on campus.

Rec Hall has undergone many renovations over its history. In recent history, the drop ceiling that was installed in the 1960s was removed in the late 1990s and the building's original roof line was restored, exposing the open steel truss ceiling and upper windows. Along with this, lighting and building acoustics were also improved. In 2005 electronic LED scoreboards were installed and lower seating bowl bleachers were replaced. Renovation of Rec Hall's south wing was completed in 2006, including expansion of the student fitness center.

The largest crowd in Rec Hall history, 8,600, witnessed the men's basketball team defeat Virginia 93–68 on December 5, 1973. Three other notable men's games were: a 74–71 loss to Jerry West-led West Virginia Feb. 15, 1958 (WVU had been AP No. 1 for much of the 1957–58 season), the 1991 Atlantic 10 Conference men's basketball tournament championship, won by Penn State, and a double overtime 88–84 loss to No. 1-ranked Indiana, coached by Bob Knight, Feb. 9, 1993. Rec Hall is also known as a classic home court advantage, as the women's volleyball team holds the NCAA volleyball record for home match winning streaks (94), which ranks in the top five of any home court winning streak for any sport, men or women's, and is only outranked by the basketball trio of Kentucky, 1943-55 (129); St. Bonaventure, 1948-61 (99) and UCLA, 1970-76 (98).

Penn State teams have won five national championships in Rec Hall: boxing (1929 and 1932), wrestling (1953) and men's gymnastics (1960 and 2007).

References

External links
 Official Rec Hall Site

College volleyball venues in the United States
College wrestling venues in the United States
Defunct college basketball venues in the United States
Sports venues in Pennsylvania
Defunct basketball venues in the United States
Penn State Nittany Lions and Lady Lions basketball venues
Pennsylvania State University campus
1929 establishments in Pennsylvania
Sports venues completed in 1929
Wrestling venues in Pennsylvania